John Terry Desko is a retired lacrosse head coach. Desko coached the men's lacrosse team at Syracuse University for 22 seasons from 1999 to 2021. Desko took over as head coach in 1999 from Hall of Fame coach Roy Simmons Jr.

Early life
The Desko family grew up in Camillus, a suburb of Syracuse. He played high school lacrosse at West Genesee, the 15-time state champions.

College career
Desko started out in the midfield but was switched to defense by assistant coach Jay Gallagher. He earned All-America honors as he helped Syracuse to a 10–5 record in 1979 and the school's first NCAA playoff berth. His two younger brothers, Dave and Jeff, were also All-American lacrosse players at Syracuse.

As Coach
Simmons offered Desko an assistant job when assistant coach Jay Gallagher decided to leave Syracuse. Desko made only $1,000 a year as a coach, and waited tables in his spare time. He stayed on as an assistant for next 19 years. After taking over the top job from Roy Simmons Jr. in 1999, he became the first person outside of the Simmons family to coach Syracuse lacrosse since 1931.

Desko won five NCAA Championships as head coach and six more as an assistant coach. In his first eleven years as head coach, he coached the Syracuse lacrosse team to seven NCAA finals appearances and nine Final Fours. The most recent championship came in May 2009, when Desko led the Orange to their 10th National Championship with a 10–9 overtime comeback victory over Cornell.

Under Desko, Syracuse won 4 straight Big East championships from 2010 to 2013. After joining the ACC in 2013–14, Syracuse won back-to-back ACC Tournament championships in 2015 and 2016. Syracuse was also the regular season champion in 2018.

Desko also coached Team USA to a runner-up finish at the 2006 World Lacrosse Championship.

On June 6, 2021, Syracuse Women's Lacrosse team head coach Gary Gait was named as head coach of the Syracuse Men's Lacrosse team, replacing Desko, who retired after 22 seasons as head coach.

Awards
Desko was named USILA Division I Coach of the Year for 2008 after guiding the Orange to a title over Johns Hopkins.

He was the ACC coach of the year for the fourth straight season from 2015 to 2018.

Desko was inducted into the Upstate Chapter of the US Lacrosse Hall of Fame as of 1997, Greater Syracuse Sports Hall of Fame in 2008, and the Camillus/West Genesee Hall of Fame in 2011. He was the FieldTurf Coach of the Year in 2013.

Desko was elected to the National Lacrosse Hall of Fame in May 2020. Desko is the third Syracuse head coach to be inducted into their respective sport's hall of fame after Jim Boeheim and Gary Gait.

Personal life
Desko resides in Syracuse with his wife, Cindy, and their four children; Tim (Timothy), Nicole, Casey and Ryan. Three of his four children attended Syracuse University (Nicole attended Hobart & William Smith Colleges). Tim played on the lacrosse team for 5 years, the first being a redshirt season (winning back-to-back national titles in 2008 and 2009), and has been a lacrosse coach at several colleges, including Rollins College.

References

External links
 Syracuse profile

Living people
Syracuse Orange men's lacrosse coaches
Syracuse Orange men's lacrosse players
1957 births